Faureothrips is a genus of thrips in the family Phlaeothripidae.

Species
 Faureothrips reticulatus

References

Phlaeothripidae
Thrips genera
Taxa named by Hermann Priesner